Dick Turpin is a 1933 British historical drama film directed by Victor Hanbury and John Stafford it starred Victor McLaglen, Jane Carr, Frank Vosper, James Finlayson and Cecil Humphreys. The film depicts the adventures of the eighteenth century highwayman Dick Turpin and his legendary ride to York. It is based on a historical novel by Harrison Ainsworth.

It was made at Cricklewood Studios with sets designed by the art director Wilfred Arnold. It was the last film made by Stoll Pictures which had once been the dominant producer in Britain during the silent era.

Cast
 Victor McLaglen as Dick Turpin 
 Jane Carr as Eleanor Mowbray 
 Frank Vosper as Tom King 
 James Finlayson as Jeremy
 Cecil Humphreys as Sir Luke Rookwood 
 Gillian Lind as Nan 
 Gibb McLaughlin as Governor of Newgate 
 Alexander Field as Weazel Jones 
 Roy Findlay as Dan Smollet 
 Helen Ferrers as Lady Rookwood 
 Lewis Gilbert as Jem

Production
Filming was difficult. Gaumont British were called in to invest an additional $100,000.

References

Bibliography
 Low, Rachael. Filmmaking in 1930s Britain. George Allen & Unwin, 1985.
 Wood, Linda. British Films, 1927-1939. British Film Institute, 1986.

External links

1933 films
1930s historical drama films
British historical drama films
British biographical drama films
Films set in the 1730s
Films set in England
Films set in York
1930s biographical drama films
Films directed by Victor Hanbury
Stoll Pictures films
Films shot at Cricklewood Studios
Cultural depictions of Dick Turpin
British black-and-white films
1933 drama films
Films about highwaymen
1930s English-language films
1930s British films